Walton is an unincorporated community in Roane County, West Virginia, United States. Walton has a post office with ZIP code 25286.

According to tradition, Walton was named after the maiden name of a settler's wife.

References

Unincorporated communities in Roane County, West Virginia
Unincorporated communities in West Virginia